Clavus groschi is a species of sea snail, a marine gastropod mollusk in the family Drilliidae.

Description
The length of the shell attains 22.5 mm, its diameter 9.5 mm. Characteristic for this claviform shell is that the dark median zone is bordered posteriorly by an interrupted brown line.

Distribution
This species occurs in the demersal zone of the Indian Ocean off Mozambique.

References

 Kilburn R.N. (1988). Turridae (Mollusca: Gastropoda) of southern Africa and Mozambique. Part 4. Subfamilies Drillinae, Crassispirinae and Strictispirinae. Annals of the Natal Museum. 29(1): 167–320. page(s): 190, figs 7, 97–100
 Tucker, J.K. 2004 Catalog of recent and fossil turrids (Mollusca: Gastropoda). Zootaxa 682:1–1295

External links

groschi
Gastropods described in 1988